Gak is a  boma in  Kolnyang payam, Bor South County, Jonglei State, South Sudan.

Demographics
According to the Fifth Population and Housing Census of Sudan, conducted in April 2008, Gak  boma had a population of 3,077 people, composed of 1,570 male and 1,507 female residents.

Notes

References 

Populated places in Jonglei State